Egzon Binaku (born 27 August 1995) is a professional footballer who plays as a left-back for Swedish club GAIS. Born in Sweden, he represented the Albania national team.

Personal life
Binaku was born in Åmål, Sweden from Kosovo Albanian parents from the Kosovan town of Mitrovica.

Club career
On 4 May 2015, he made his Allsvenskan debut for BK Häcken against Halmstads BK.

International career

On 21 May 2018, Binaku received a call-up from Albania for the friendly matches against Kosovo and Ukraine.

Career statistics

Club

Honours
BK Häcken
Svenska Cupen: 2015–16

References

External links

1995 births
Living people
People from Åmål Municipality
Swedish people of Albanian descent
Swedish people of Kosovan descent
Association football defenders
Albanian men's footballers
Albania international footballers
Swedish men's footballers
Sweden under-21 international footballers
Sweden youth international footballers
IFK Åmål players
BK Häcken players
Ljungskile SK players
Malmö FF players
IFK Norrköping players
GAIS players
Allsvenskan players
Superettan players
Sportspeople from Västra Götaland County